Antônio Vieira was a Brazilian professional football coach who managed the Kuwaiti national team between 1987 and 1988.

References

Year of birth missing (living people)
Living people
Brazilian football managers
20th-century Brazilian people
Kuwait national football team managers
Brazilian expatriate football managers
Brazilian expatriate sportspeople in Kuwait
Expatriate football managers in Kuwait